The Cosmic Geoids and One Other is a collection of two science fiction novellas by author John Taine (pseudonym of American writer Eric Temple Bell). It was first published in 1949 by Fantasy Publishing Company, Inc. in an edition of 1,200 copies.  The title novella is a loose sequel to Taine's novel, The Time Stream, and was later serialized in the magazine Spaceway, in three parts beginning in December 1954.  The other novella, "Black Goldfish", was first serialized in the magazine  Fantasy Book, in two parts beginning in 1948.

Contents
 "The Cosmic Geoids"
 "Black Goldfish"

Reception
Reviewing the volume in Astounding, Forrest J Ackerman found the two stories wildly disparate: the title piece was "truly Stapledonian, but "Black Goldfish" was "the weakest thing Taine has ever done."

References

Sources

1949 short story collections
Science fiction short story collections
Works by Eric Temple Bell
Works published under a pseudonym
Fantasy Publishing Company, Inc. books